is a Prefectural Natural Park in Nagasaki Prefecture, Japan. The park was established in 1951.

See also
 National Parks of Japan
 Taradake Prefectural Natural Park (Saga)

References

Parks and gardens in Nagasaki Prefecture
Protected areas established in 1951
1951 establishments in Japan